Colevale is a coastal locality in the Shire of Burdekin, Queensland, Australia.

Geography
The northern coastal part of Colevale, bounded by the Coral Sea, is within the Bowling Green Bay National Park.

History 
The locality was named and bounded on 23 February 2001.

References 

Shire of Burdekin
Coastline of Queensland
Localities in Queensland